is a professional Japanese baseball player. He plays catcher for the Hokkaido Nippon-Ham Fighters.

External links

 NPB.com

1996 births
Living people
Baseball people from Yamaguchi Prefecture
Japanese baseball players
Nippon Professional Baseball catchers
Hokkaido Nippon-Ham Fighters players